Patrick "Paudeen" McLaughlin (1822 – March 20, 1858) was a New York criminal and a "slugger" for Tammany Hall during the middle of the 19th century. McLaughlin, whose nose had previously been chewed off during a brawl in the Five Points with the Alderman of the First Ward, was widely regarded in the underworld for his skill with a bludgeon and slung-shot.

Biography
Born to Irish immigrants in Cohoes Falls (near Lansingburgh, New York), McLaughlin left home at an early age to work as an immigrant runner in New York and soon became a well known street fighter and was imprisoned for a time on Blackwell's Island. After being severely disfigured in a brawl with a future Alderman of the First Ward, he retired from immigrant running and was employed as hired muscle for the Erie Railroad Company for several years. During the mid-1850s, he and Jim Turner were bodyguards for Lewis "Lew" Baker during his feud with William "Bill the Butcher" Poole. He, along with Turner and several others were eventually convicted of aiding and abetting Baker after he shot and killed Poole on February 25, 1855.

McLaughlin himself, while drinking at a Howard Street saloon and dance hall, was mortally wounded when he was shot on the morning of March 20, 1858 by sportsman Daniel "Dad" Cunningham. He and Cunningham had become involved in a heated argument after McLaughlin had insulted the boxing abilities of John Morrissey. When a fight broke out between the two men, Cunningham pulled a revolver and shot McLaughlin in the chest. Although later taken to the New York City Hospital, he would die of his wounds several hours after his arrival as doctors failed to find the bullet which remained lodged in his chest.

References

1822 births
1858 deaths
Gang members of New York City
American gangsters of Irish descent
American gangsters
People from Lansingburgh, New York